Henry William Connor (1793–1866) was a Congressional Representative from North Carolina; born near Amelia Courthouse, Prince George County, Virginia, August 5, 1793; was graduated from South Carolina College at Columbia in 1812; served as aide-de-camp to Brig. Gen. Joseph Graham with rank of major in the expedition against the Creek Indians in 1814; settled in Falls Town, North Carolina; engaged in planting; elected as a Democratic-Republican to the Seventeenth Congress; elected as a Jackson Republican to the Eighteenth Congress; elected as a Jacksonian to the Nineteenth through the Twenty-fourth Congresses, and elected as a Democrat to the Twenty-fifth and Twenty-sixth Congresses (March 4, 1821 – March 3, 1841); chairman, Committee on the Post Office and Post Roads (Twenty-second through Twenty-fifth Congresses); was not a candidate for renomination in 1840; member of the State senate 1848–1850; died at Beatties Ford, North Carolina, January 6, 1866; interment in Rehobeth Methodist Church Cemetery, near Sherrills Ford, North Carolina

See also
Seventeenth United States Congress
Eighteenth United States Congress
Nineteenth United States Congress
Twentieth United States Congress
Twenty-first United States Congress
Twenty-second United States Congress
Twenty-third United States Congress
Twenty-fourth United States Congress
Twenty-fifth United States Congress
Twenty-sixth United States Congress
Entry in US Congress Biographical database

External links

Democratic Party North Carolina state senators
1793 births
1866 deaths
North Carolina Democratic-Republicans
Democratic-Republican Party members of the United States House of Representatives
Jacksonian members of the United States House of Representatives from North Carolina
19th-century American politicians
Democratic Party members of the United States House of Representatives from North Carolina
People from Prince George County, Virginia